Padma Shri Na Muthuswamy (1936 – 24 October 2018) was the art director of Tamil folk theatre group Koothu-P-Pattarai, which is based in Chennai, Tamil Nadu in South India.

Muthuswamy has been described by The Hindu as "the master of the avant-garde". Muthusamy also made his first film appearance in Vaazhthugal (2008).

Biography 
Muthuswamy first achieved prominence as a result of the play "Kalam Kalamaga", which has been described as the "first modern play in Tamil".He won the Sangeet Natak Akademi Award from the Government of India for year 1999. He was awarded as Padma Shri,  the fourth highest civilian award by the Government of India in 2012.

He died on 24 October 2018 at the age of 82.

References

1936 births
2018 deaths
Male actors in Tamil cinema
Indian theatre directors
Tamil dramatists and playwrights
Writers from Chennai
Recipients of the Sangeet Natak Akademi Award
Recipients of the Padma Shri in arts
Indian male dramatists and playwrights
Dramatists and playwrights from Tamil Nadu